Mara District is one of the six districts of the Cotabambas Province in Peru.

Geography 
Other mountains are listed below:

Ethnic groups 
The people in the district are mainly indigenous citizens of Quechua descent. Quechua is the language which the majority of the population (94.45%) learnt to speak in childhood, 5.24% of the residents started speaking using the Spanish language (2007 Peru Census).

See also 
 Qañawimayu

References

Districts of the Cotabambas Province
Districts of the Apurímac Region